Julienne, Francophone given name, may refer to:
People
 Julienne Bušić (born 1948), American writer, political activist, and airplane hijacker
 Julienne Mavoungou Makaya, African Union Economic, Social and Cultural Council official
 Julienne Mathieu, early French silent film actress
 Julienne Salvat (1932–2019), French teacher, poet, femme de lettres, actress
 Rémy Julienne (1930–2021), French driving stunt performer and coordinator, assistant director, and champion driver
Other
 Julienning, a technique of shredding food into long, thin strips
 Julienne, Charente, a commune of the Charente département in France
 Julienne (crater), on the Moon